is a Japanese actor, voice actor and singer. His roles included Ryouta Kise in the Kuroko no Basket series, Bokuto Koutarou in Haikyū!!, Eichi Sakurai in Full Moon o Sagashite, Tartaglia in Genshin Impact, Chihiro Furuya in Sankarea, Roche in Neo Angelique ~Abyss~ series, Hinata from Angel Beats!, Akira Takizawa in Eden of the East, Shouma Takakura in Mawaru Penguindrum, Kodaka Hasegawa in Boku wa Tomodachi ga Sukunai, Touji Ato in Tokyo Ravens, Kaito Yashio in Robotics;Notes and Joshua Levinth in Lord of Heroes. He won the Best Supporting Actor Award at the 6th Seiyu Awards. He is affiliated with Himawari Theatre Group.

Filmography

Anime series
1999
Medabots as Belmont

2002
Full Moon o Sagashite as Eichi Sakurai

2005
Sugar Sugar Rune as Houx

2007
Big Windup! as Shintaro Nishihiro
Kekkaishi as Kagemiya Sen

2008
Natsume Yūjinchō as Satoru Nishimura
Neo Angelique Abyss as Roche
Shigofumi: Letters from the Departed as Daiki Senkawa (Ep. 3)

2009
Eden of the East as Akira Takizawa
Zoku Natsume Yūjinchō as Satoru Nishimura

2010

Big Windup! as Shintaro Nishihiro
Heroman as Psy
Star Driver: Kagayaki no Takuto as Ryuu Ginta/Camel Star
Yu-Gi-Oh! 5D's as Brave
Angel Beats! as Hideki Hinata

2011
C: The Money of Soul and Possibility Control as Kakuta
Gosick as Young Albert de Blois (Ep. 15)
Haganai as Kodaka Hasegawa
Hanasaku Iroha as Hiwatari Yousuke
Kamisama Dolls as Aki Kuga
Kimi to Boku as Asaba Yuuki
Natsume Yūjinchō San as Nishimura Satoru
Penguindrum as Shoma Takakura 
Un-Go as Yasutarou Mihara (Ep. 9)

2012
Beyblade: Shogun Steel as Genjuro Kamegaki
Kamisama Hajimemashita as Kotaro Urashima
Kimi to Boku 2 as Yuki Asaba
Kuroko's Basketball as Ryouta Kise
Magi: The Labyrinth of Magic as Judar
Natsume Yūjinchō Shi as Satoru Nishimura
Robotics;Notes as Kaito Yashio
Sakamichi no Apollon as Kaoru Nishimi
Sankarea: Undying Love as Chihiro Furuya
The Ambition of Oda Nobuna as Yoshikage Asakura
Yu-Gi-Oh! Zexal Special as Taiki Kimura

2013
Arata: The Legend as Masato Kadowaki
Blood Lad as Braz D. Blood
Haganai Next as Kodaka Hasegawa
Jewelpet Happiness as Takumi Asano
Kuroko's Basketball 2nd Season as Ryouta Kise
Magi: The Kingdom of Magic as Judar
Meganebu! as Hayato Kimata
Psycho-Pass as Ryogo Kozuki
RDG Red Data Girl as Masumi Sōda
Saiyuki Gaiden as Rikuo
Silver Spoon as Yugo Hachiken
Sunday Without God as Lion-masked teenager (Eps. 5, 6)
Tokyo Ravens as Touji Ato
Valvrave the Liberator as L-Elf Karlstein

2014
Akame ga Kill! as Syura
Bonjour♪Sweet Love Patisserie as Gilbert Hanafusa
Buddy Complex as Tusais Framboise
Monthly Girls' Nozaki-kun as Hirotaka Wakamatsu
Kuroshitsuji: Book of Circus as Charles Grey
Lord Marksman and Vanadis as Zion Thenardier
Love Stage as Takahiro Kuroi
The Seven Deadly Sins as Howzer
Nobunaga Concerto as Azai Nagamasa
Psycho-Pass 2 as Kirito Kamui
Silver Spoon 2nd season as Yugo Hachiken
Space Dandy as Gentle (Eps. 18, 19)
The Irregular at Magic High School as Gyobu Hattori
Hybrid Child as Ichi Seya

2015
Aoharu x Machinegun as Takatora Fujimoto
Ace of Diamond Second Season as Kōsei Amahisa
Castle Town Dandelion as Shū Sakurada
Chaos Dragon as Sol
Charlotte as Arifumi Fukuyama (Ep. 4)
Diabolik Lovers More Blood as Kou Mukami
Fafner in the Azure: Exodus as Misao Kurusu
Haikyū!! 2 as Kōtaro Bokuto
Kamisama Hajimemashita◎ as Kotaro Urashima
Kuroko's Basketball 3rd Season as Ryouta Kise
Q Transformers: Return of the Mystery of Convoy as Bumblebee
Kyoukai no Rinne as Tsubasa Jūmonji
Tales of Zestiria: Doshi no Yoake as Sorey
Uta no Prince-sama: Maji Love Revolutions as Hyūga Yamato

2016
Battery as Shunji Mizugaki
Haruchika: Haruta & Chika as Tōru Asagiri
Joker Game as Kaminaga
Kuromukuro as Tom Borden
Kyoukai no Rinne Season 2 as Tsubasa Jūmonji
Macross Delta as Harry Takasugi, Keith Aero Windermere
Prince of Stride: Alternative as Riku Yagami
ReLIFE as Ryō Yoake
Servamp as Lawless
Shōwa Genroku Rakugo Shinjū as Pūta
Tales of Zestiria the X as Sorey
Tōken Ranbu: Hanamaru as Izuminokami Kanesada
Tsukiuta. The Animation as Shun Shimotsuki
Uta no Prince-sama Maji LOVE Legend Star as Hyūga Yamato

2017
Chō Shōnen Tantei-dan NEO as Kobayashi
Tales of Zestiria the X Season 2 as Sorey
Kyoukai no Rinne Season 3 as Tsubasa Jūmonji
Katsugeki/Touken Ranbu as Izuminokami Kanesada
Dive!! as Hiroya Sakai
Boruto: Naruto Next Generations as Shizuma Hoshigaki
Dynamic Chord as Tsumugi Momose
 Our love has always been 10 centimeters apart as Chiaki Serizawa

2018
The Seven Deadly Sins: Revival of the Commandments as Howzer
Devils' Line as Hans Lee
Junji Ito Collection as Yuji, Hiroshi Sakaguchi, Yoshiyuki, Kiyoshi Kitagawa, Yasumin, Yamamoto
Nil Admirari no Tenbin: Teito Genwaku Kitan as Shougo Ukai
Tokyo Ghoul:re as Taishi Fura
Touken Ranbu: Hanamaru 2 as Izuminokami Kanesada
 Free! Dive to the Future as Hiyori Tono
Grand Blue as Kohei Imamura
Holmes at Kyoto Teramachi Sanjō as Akihito Kajiwara
Isekai Izakaya "Nobu" as Jean-Francois Mount de Lavigni
Zombie Land Saga as Inubashi
Radiant as Piodan

2019
Ace of Diamond Act II as Kōsei Amahisa
Demon Slayer: Kimetsu no Yaiba as Swamp Demon
Kochoki: Wakaki Nobunaga as Sakuma Nobumori
Welcome to Demon School! Iruma-kun as Alice Asmodeus
Phantasy Star Online 2: Episode Oracle as Zeno

2020
Smile Down the Runway as Toh Ayano
Haikyū!! To The Top as Kōtaro Bokuto
A Destructive God Sits Next to Me as Utsugi Tsukimiya
Dorohedoro as Jonson
Gibiate as Katsunori Hamuro
The Misfit of Demon King Academy as Ledriano Kanon Azeschen
Yashahime: Princess Half-Demon as Kohaku
Ikebukuro West Gate Park as Saru
Tsukiuta. The Animation 2 as Shun Shimotsuki
The Day I Became a God as Ashura Kokuhō

2021
I-Chu: Halfway Through the Idol as Aoi Kakitsubata
Koikimo as Masuda
Odd Taxi as Gо̄riki
The World Ends with You the Animation as Yoshiya "Joshua" Kiryu
Welcome to Demon School! Iruma-kun Season 2 as Alice Asmodeus
Life Lessons with Uramichi Oniisan as Hanabee Kikaku
Restaurant to Another World 2 as Thomas

2022
Kaginado Season 2 as Hideki Hinata
A Couple of Cuckoos as Yōhei Umino
The Rising of the Shield Hero 2 as Kyo Ethnina
Bibliophile Princess as Christopher Selkirk Ashelard
Welcome to Demon School! Iruma-kun Season 3 as Alice Asmodeus

2023
Handyman Saitō in Another World as Saitō
Hell's Paradise: Jigokuraku as Chōbei Aza

Original video animation (OVA)
Kono Danshi Uchuujin to Tatakaemasu (2011) as Kakashi
Nagareboshi Lens (2012) as Yūdai
Arata-naru Sekai (2012) as Kirishima
Yondemasuyo, Azazel-san (2014) as Osamu Koyamauchi
Hybrid Child (2014) as Ichi Seya
Kuroshitsuji: Book of Murder (2014) as Charles Grey
Tokyo Ghoul: JACK (2015) as Taishi Fura
Kuroko's Basketball: Saikou no Present Desu (2015) as Ryōta Kise
Trick or Alice (2016) as Ren Kisaragi
My Hero Academia (2017) as Romero Fujimi

Drama CD
Last Game as Naoto Yanagi
 as A'
Ikemen Vampire as Arthur Conan Doyle

Web animation
Mobile Suit Gundam Thunderbolt (2015) as Daryl Lorenz
Ultraman (2019) as Shinjiro Hayata
Junji Ito Maniac: Japanese Tales of the Macabre (2023) as Tsuyoshi Yoshikawa

Anime films
Cencoroll (2009) as Shū
Eden of the East Compilation: Air Communication (2009) as Akira Takizawa
Eden of the East the Movie I: The King of Eden (2009) as Akira Takizawa
Eden of the East the Movie II: Paradise Lost (2010) as Akira Takizawa
Fafner in the Azure: Heaven and Earth (2010) as Misao Kurusu
Fullmetal Alchemist: The Sacred Star of Milos (2011) as Ashley Crichton (young)
Inazuma Eleven Go vs Danball Senki W (2012) as Asta
Nerawareta Gakuen (2012) as Yū Jinno
Aura: Koga Maryuin's Last War (2013) as Yuuta Takahashi
Black Butler: Book of the Atlantic (2017) as Charles Grey
Kuroko's Basketball The Movie: Last Game as Ryouta Kise
Free! Take Your Marks (2017) as Hiyori Tono
Servamp -Alice in the Garden- (2018) as Lawless
My Hero Academia: Two Heroes (2018) as David Shield (teenage version)
Natsume's Book of Friends Movie (2018) as Satoru Nishimura
Yo-kai Watch: Forever Friends as Itsuki Takashiro
Cencoroll Connect (2019) as Shū
Weathering with You (2019) as Kimura
Free! The Final Stroke Part 1 (2021) as Hiyori Tono
Free! The Final Stroke Part 2 (2022) as Hiyori Tono
Odd Taxi: In the Woods (2022) as Gо̄riki
Re:cycle of Penguindrum (2022) as Shōma Takakura
Gekijōban Collar × Malice Deep Cover (2023) as Kageyuki Shiraishi

Video games
2005
Nana as Shinichi Okazaki (PS2 version)
2007
Big Windup! as Shintarou Nishihiro
Elsword as Add
The World Ends with You as Yoshiya "Joshua" Kiryu
2008
Neo Angelique Abyss as Roche
2010
The 3rd Birthday as Dr. Blank
Otome Desk (乙女デスク) as Minai Hidenori
2011
Gakuen Tokkyuu Hotokenser as Dōjima Mitsuki/Hotoken Green
Kirameki! Nekketsu Rabu (きらめき！熱血-ラ部) as Kazamatsuri Hayato
2012
Custom Drive as Kannagi Shion
Diabolik Lovers series as Mukami Kou
Kingdom Hearts: Dream Drop Distance as Yoshiya "Joshua" Kiryu
Kuroko no Basuke: Kiseki no Game as Ryouta Kise
Phantasy Star Online 2 as Zeno and Persona
Pokémon as Cheren (Black 2 White 2 Animated Trailer)
Renai Bancho 2 Midnight Lesson! as Data Bancho
Robotics;Notes as Kaito Yashio
Under Night In-Birth as Hyde Kido
Boku Wa Tomodachi Ga Sukunai Portable as Hasegawa Kodaka
2013
SNOW BOUND LAND as Kai
London Detective Mysteria as William.H.Watson/Watson Jr (PSP version)
Super Robot Wars UX as Misao Kurusu, Simon "Psy" Kaina
The Wonderful 101 as Wonder-Red
Koibana Days as Kikunosuke Takaoka
2014
Lost Dimension as Touya Orbert
Infamous Second Son as Eugene
Ayakashi Koi Gikyoku as Kasumi
2015
Dragon Ball Xenoverse as Time Patroller (Male 8)
Tales of Zestiria as Sorey
Touken Ranbu as Izuminokami Kanesada
Tokyo Mirage Sessions ♯FE as Itsuki Aoi
Angel Beats! -1st beat- as Hinata 
2016
I-Chu as Aoi Kakitsubata
Dragon Ball Xenoverse 2 as Time Patroller (Male 8)
Mobile Legends: Bang Bang as Hanzo (Android/iOS)
Collar x Malice Kageyuki Shiraishi
Fate/Extella Link as Charlemagne
Icchibanketsu -ONLINE as Saizou
2017
Akane-sasu Sekai de Kimi to Utau as Maeda Keiji
Danganronpa V3: Killing Harmony as Kaito Momota
Diabolik Lovers LOST EDEN as Mukami Kou
2018
BlazBlue: Cross Tag Battle as Hyde Kido
Food Fantasy as Sweet Tofu
Seven Deadly Sins: Britannia no Tabibito as Hauser 
Piofiore no Banshō as Nicola Francesca
2019
Op8 as Yuduki Kanato
Robotics;Notes DaSH as Yashio Kaito
Hoshinari Echoes as Shirogane Subaru
Inazuma Eleven: Balance Of Ares as Michinari Tatsumi
Kaikan Phrase CLIMAX -NEXT GENERATION as Kiryuu Takuya
DIABOLIK LOVERS CHAOS LINEAGE as Kou
Tokyo Chronos as Lowe
Ikémen Vampire as Arthur Conan Doyle
Another Eden as Shigure
Saint Seiya Awakening as Unicorn Jabu
2020
Sangokushi Hadou as Zhuge Liang
Pokémon Masters as TBA
Fire Emblem Heroes as Julian
Genshin Impact as Tartaglia
Lord of Heroes as Joshua Levinth
2021 
Loopers as Simon
NEO: The World Ends with You as Yoshiya "Joshua" Kiryu
2022
Xenoblade Chronicles 3 as Taion
Fate/Grand Order as Charlemagne

Dubbing

Live-action
The 5th Wave (Ben Parish (Nick Robinson))
The 100 (Jasper Jordan (Devon Bostick))
Babel (Ahmed (Said Tarchani))
The Ballad of Buster Scruggs (Harrison (Harry Melling))
Bumblebee (Bumblebee (Dylan O'Brien))
The Chronicles of Narnia film series (Peter Pevensie (William Moseley))
The Client (1997 TV Asahi edition) (Mark Sway (Brad Renfro))
The Country Bears (Dexter "Dex" Barrington (Eli Marienthal))
Dark Phoenix (Scott Summers / Cyclops (Tye Sheridan))
A Dog's Way Home (Lucas Ray (Jonah Hauer-King))
Dope (Malcolm Adekanbi (Shameik Moore))
Fargo (Scotty Lundegaard (Tony Denman))
The Flash (Hartley Rathaway/Pied Piper (Andy Mientus))
Honey, We Shrunk Ourselves (Adam Szalinski (Bug Hall))
Jack (Louie Durante (Adam Zolotin))
Jumanji: Welcome to the Jungle (Spencer Gilpin (Alex Wolff))
Life of Pi (Pi Patel (Suraj Sharma))
Medium episode "Sweet Child O' Mine" (Jessie Andrews/Brian (Noel Fisher))
Old (Trent Cappa (Alex Wolff))
The Patriot (Thomas Martin (Gregory Smith))
Percy Jackson: Sea of Monsters (Tyson (Douglas Smith))
The Revenant (Hawk (Forrest Goodluck))
Simon Birch (Joe Wenteworth (Joseph Mazzello))
Smash (Kyle Bishop (Andy Mientus))
The Three Musketeers (King Louis XIII (Freddie Fox))
The Untamed (trailer only) (Wei Wuxian (Xiao Zhan))
When the Game Stands Tall (Chris Ryan (Alexander Ludwig))
X-Men: Apocalypse (Scott Summers / Cyclops (Tye Sheridan))

Animation

Kim Possible (Wade Load)

Music video 
Innosense by FLOW with Ryōta Ōsaka

References

External links
Official agency profile 

1984 births
Living people
Japanese male child actors
Japanese male musical theatre actors
Japanese male singers
Japanese male video game actors
Japanese male voice actors
Male voice actors from Tokyo
20th-century Japanese male actors
21st-century Japanese male actors
Japanese YouTubers